Mailfence is an encrypted email service that offers OpenPGP based end-to-end encryption and digital signatures. It was launched in November 2013 by ContactOffice Group, which has been operating an online collaboration suite for universities and other organizations since 1999.

History

Development 
In the midst of 2013, the Mailfence project was started by the founders of ContactOffice. In March 2016, a beta version of end-to-end encryption and digital signatures for emails was released.
In January 2021, Mailfence released progressive web application for mobile devices.

Block in Russia 
On 5 March 2020, Mailfence reported that their SMTP servers are blocked by Russian based email services. This was in response to their refusal to submit a Notice of Commencement of Collaboration with Roskomnadzor’s (the Federal Supervision Agency for Communications, Information Technology, and Mass Communication) of the Russian government. Mailfence did not respond to this request, citing obligation to provide information about users, violating its Terms and the federal Belgian laws.

Features 
Mailfence provides secure email features, with other functions such as Calendar, Contacts, Documents and Collaboration.
Encryption and Two-factor authentication are available in the free version of the product.  Most other features are only available with paid subscriptions that start at 2,50 € per month.

Email 
The service supports POP/IMAP and Exchange ActiveSync as well as vanity domains with SPF, DKIM, DMARC and catch-all address support. Users can send both plain and rich text emails, organize messages in folders and/or categorize them with tags, take notes by setting comment on each message and create default message signatures for every sender address. Different identities can also be managed using aliases and filters for incoming emails.

Contacts 
The contacts support (CSV, vCard, LDIF) import, (vCard, PDF) export and can be accessed using CardDAV. Users organize them with tags and can also create contact lists.

Calendar 
The calendar supports vCal/iCal import, export and can be accessed by using CalDAV. Users can share their calendars with group members and can also create polls.

Documents 
The documents can be accessed using WebDAV or edited online. Users can drag and drop files in folders, categorize them with tags take notes by setting comment on each file.

Groups 
Groups allow users to share mailboxes, documents, contacts, calendars and perform instant chatting with group members in a secure way. A group administrator manages the access rights of group members and can also set another group member as co-admin or the main admin of the group.

Polls 
Mailfence Polls is a secure meeting scheduler.

Chat 
Jabber/XMPP protocol is the base of Mailfence chat functionality. First named Jabber, then XMPP (Extensible Messaging and Presence Protocol), this open-source protocol has been created for instant messaging.

Web-based clients 
The web-interface comes with an embedded IMAP, POP3, CalDAV, and WebDAV client. Users can add external accounts and manage them centrally in the web-interface.

User management 
Account owners can create and manage user accounts using the admin console.

Server location 
Since their servers are located in Belgium, they are legally outside of US jurisdiction. Mailfence is therefore not subjected to US gag orders and NSLs, notwithstanding extradition treaties with the US. Under Belgian law, all national and international surveillance requests must go through a Belgian court.

Security and privacy 
Aside from conventional security and privacy features including managing access or generating specific password for web and non-web services, two-factor authentication, spam protection alongside of plus addressing, sender address blacklist and whitelist, Mailfence offers following features:

Transport security 
The service uses TLS with ephemeral key exchange to encrypt all internet traffic between users and Mailfence servers. HSTS, MTA-STS and DANE standards are also supported.

End-to-end encryption 
The service uses an open-source implementation of OpenPGP (RFC 4880) for emails. OpenPGP keypair is generated in client-browser, encrypted (via AES256) with the user's passphrase, and then stored on Mailfence server. The server never sees the user's OpenPGP keypair passphrase.
The service also supports end-to-end encryption for emails using a shared password with the possibility of message expiration.

OpenPGP signatures 
The service gives the choice between "signing", or "signing and encrypting" an email message with or without attachments.

Integrated Keystore 
The service provides an integrated keystore to manage OpenPGP keys, and does not require any third-party add-on/plugin. OpenPGP keypairs can be generated, imported or exported. Public keys of other users can be imported through file or in-line text and can also be downloaded from OpenPGP Web Key Directory or Public key servers.

Full OpenPGP interoperability 
Users can communicate with any OpenPGP compatible service provider.

Warrant canary and transparency report 
The service maintains an up-to-date transparency report and warrant canary.

See also 
 Comparison of mail servers
 Comparison of webmail providers

References

External links 
 

Webmail
Cross-platform software
Security software
Cryptographic software
Secure communication
Internet privacy software
Internet properties established in 2013
OpenPGP